Darwin Ramos (December 17, 1994 – September 23, 2012) was a Filipino street child and waste picker that became Servant of God of the Catholic Church. Darwin discovered Catholic faith when he was 11 years old. He died from Duchenne muscular dystrophy. After his death, the "Darwin Ramos Association" requested in 2018 to Honesto Ongtioco, Bishop of the Diocese of Cubao to initiate a cause for beatification and canonization. The Solemn Opening Celebration of the cause was celebrated on August 28, 2019 at the Cathedral of the Immaculate Conception in Cubao. Darwin Ramos could become the first non-martyr Saint of the Philippines.

Biography

1994–2006: Family life and life on the streets 
Darwin Ramos was born on December 17, 1994 in Doña Marta Maternity Hospital, in Pasay. Darwin spent his early years with his family along P. Villanueva St., Pasay. Their house was in a slum between EDSA and Libertad LRT stations. Darwin was the second child of a very poor family. His mother worked as a laundrywoman to earn some money to provide for her family while his father was an alcoholic. In order to help his family, Darwin became a waste picker in the street, with his sister Marimar who was two years younger. They spent their day going through garbage to recover plastic waste which they sold. The children did not go to school because of grave financial situation.

The initial symptoms of what later would be diagnosed as Duchenne muscular dystrophy appeared. This began as weakness in the legs. Then, his mother noticed that Darwin was stumbling increasingly. Progressively, Darwin could no longer stand as his muscles weakened further.

Poverty pushed the family to live on the street. His father took advantage of Darwin’s illness and he would position Darwin every morning at the Libertad station to beg from passers-by who took pity on the boy. In spite of the terrible shame felt by Darwin, hundreds of pesos fell into his hands which he held out painfully. His father frequently took a large portion of the money to buy alcohol. Darwin would not complain as long as a sufficient portion was left to feed his brothers and sisters.

In 2006, a group of street educators of the Tulay ng Kabataan Foundation, came into contact with Darwin while he was panhandling at the Libertad station, and offered to take him in. Darwin agreed as he no longer could stand up straight, and was using his hands and remained seated.

2006–2012: Life at the Tulay ng Kabataan Foundation 
At the Tulay ng Kabataan Foundation (meaning "a bridge for children" in Tagalog), Darwin lived with boys and girls with special needs caused by different disabilities. He was baptized under Catholic rite  on December 23, 2006 at the Shrine of Mary, Queen of Peace, Our Lady of EDSA (also known as the EDSA Shrine). One year later, he received first communion and confirmation from Auxiliary Bishop of Manila, Broderick Pabillo, at the chapel of the Major Seminary of San Carlos, Guadalupe.

Darwin increasingly suffered more respiratory distress that required consecutive hospitalizations. He uplifted the staff and the children at the Foundation by the way he lived with his illness. He was constantly repeating "Thank you" and "I love you". He never complained and always smiled even during most difficult times. He was attentive to all and showed support to the other children at the Foundation in their trials. He had the habit of offering his sufferings. When he was speaking of his own illness, he did not talk about his myopathy but of what he called as being his "mission". One day, he said to the priest of the Foundation : "You know Father, I think Jesus wants me to hold on until the end, just like he did".

Darwin developed a deep personal relationship with Christ. Not a day passed that the young boy did not take time out to entrust himself to Jesus. A caregiver from the Foundation testified: "One day, when Darwin was feverish, he insisted to be helped in getting out of bed to join the others in the center so that he could lead the evening prayer. It was Jesus before anything else".

September 2012: Darwin's final week 
On Sunday, September 16, 2012, the nurse of the foundation decided to bring Darwin to the (Philippine Children's Medical Center (PCMC) in Quezon City) because he had difficulty breathing. When the priest in charge of the Tulay ng Kabataan Foundation arrived at his bedside, the first thing that Darwin did was to excuse himself for causing the priest worries. Darwin added as he breathed laboriously: "Thank you for everything Father". Then began what some would describe as  "Darwin's Holy Week":

On Monday, September 17, Darwin was intubated. He was not able to talk anymore. It was only possible to lip-read him, but he was able to write in a notebook. On Thursday, September 20, Darwin experienced a spiritual battle, his Maundy Thursday:
 Darwin: “We must pray.”
 Priest: “Of course Darwin, but why do you need to pray?”
 Darwin: “Because I am fighting.”
 Priest: “Fighting against your disease?”
 Darwin: “I am fighting against the devil.”

Darwin then received the anointing of the sick. On Friday, September 21, he looked peaceful and had a big smile. He wrote his two last sentences in a notebook: "A huge thank you" and "I am very happy" as a sign of a battle won. On Saturday, Darwin entered into a great silence while remaining conscious. He died on Sunday, September 23, 2012, at sunrise, at the PCMC in Quezon City). The funeral mass was celebrated in a full church, attended by all the children of the Tulay ng Kabataan Foundation. Darwin was buried at the Pasay City Public Cemetery.

Cause of beatification and canonization 
In the Philippines, the memory of Darwin's life remains in the minds of many. People continue to gather at his tomb in Pasay City Cemetery. In France, Father Matthieu Dauchez wrote a book in 2015 entitled Plus fort que les ténèbres [Stronger than Darkness]. In 2016, Daniel-Ange de Maupeou d'Ableiges wrote another book entitled Prophètes de la Beauté [Prophets of Beauty] with the initial pages dedicated to the life of Darwin Ramos. Many readers were touched by his example of joy and love through disease and suffering, throughout his adolescence, and his countless testimonies of the graces received by his intercession: "In spite of the disease, it is his joy of living and his luminous glance that will have touched more than one. Darwin has left the image of a young boy edifying with holiness, who despite his young age, quickly realized that his illness, much more than an irreversible ordeal, was none the less a mission... A mission guided by the One he loved so much to call his Friend: Jesus."

In 2018, the "Darwin Ramos Association" requested from Honesto Ongtioco, Bishop of the Roman Catholic Diocese of Cubao (Philippines), to open the cause for beatification and canonization of Darwin Ramos. The Darwin Ramos Association on March 14, 2018 assigned the Dominican priest Thomas de Gabory as postulator. Ongtioco confirmed this nomination by Decree of May 25, 2018. The postulator officially addressed the written request (Supplex Libellus) to open the cause of beatification and canonization of Darwin Ramos on June 20, 2018. The acceptance letter was signed on November 7, 2018. Robert T. Young, a Filipino canon lawyer, was nominated as vice-postulator.

After having obtained the Nihil obstat (on March 29, 2019) of the Congregation for the Causes of Saints in Rome, and after the consultation of the faithful by the publication of the edict during 2 months, the cause was officially open in public on August 28, 2019 at the Immaculate Conception cathedral of Cubao by Ongtioco. An ecclesiastical tribunal was assign to hear witnesses.

Bibliography 
 Matthieu Dauchez, Plus fort que les ténèbres [Stronger than Darkness], Paris (France), Éditions Artège, 2015, 168 p.
 Daniel-Ange de Maupeou d'Ableiges, Prophètes de la Beauté [Prophets of Beauty], Montrouge (France), Éditions du Jubilé,  2016, 236 p., pp. 25–38.
 « Ma Figure Spirituelle, Darwin Ramos », La Vie, 29 avril 2015.
 Alexandra Chapeleau, « La mission de Darwin Ramos: « Plus fort que les ténèbres » », on fr.zenith.org, 20 mars 2015.
 Archives preserved by the Postulation of the Cause of Beatification and Canonization.

See also 
 Lorenzo Ruiz
 Pedro Calungsod
 List of Filipino Saints, Blesseds, and Servants of God

Notes and references

External links 
 Darwin Ramos Association (Official Website)
 Roman Catholic Diocese of Cubao (Philippines)
 Congregation for the Causes of Saints (Vatican) (it)
 ANAK-Tnk Foundation

1994 births
2012 deaths
Filipino Servants of God
People with muscular dystrophy
People from Pasay
Street children
Tagalog people
21st-century venerated Christians